Folkia is a genus of Balkan woodlouse hunting spiders that was first described by J. Kratochvíl in 1970 as subgenus of Stalagtia, and elevated to genus status in 1974.

Species
 it contains seven species:
Folkia boudewijni Deeleman-Reinhold, 1993 – Croatia
Folkia haasi (Reimoser, 1929) – Croatia
Folkia inermis (Absolon & Kratochvíl, 1933) (type) – Croatia
Folkia lugens Brignoli, 1974 – Greece
Folkia mrazeki (Nosek, 1904) – Montenegro
Folkia pauciaculeata (Fage, 1943) – Bosnia-Hercegovina
Folkia subcupressa Deeleman-Reinhold, 1993 – Croatia

References

Araneomorphae genera
Dysderidae